These are lists of Indian governors, both before and after Indian independence in 1947.

Post-independence

 List of current Indian governors
 List of female Indian governors and lieutenant governors
 List of governors of Andhra Pradesh
 List of governors of Arunachal Pradesh
 List of governors of Assam
 List of governors of Bihar
 List of governors of Bombay (1948–1960), also pre-independence
 List of governors of Chhattisgarh
 List of governors of Goa
 List of governors of Gujarat
 List of governors of Haryana
 List of governors of Himachal Pradesh
 List of governors of Jammu and Kashmir (1965–2019)
 List of governors of Jharkhand
 List of governors of Karnataka
 List of governors of Kerala
 List of governors of Madhya Pradesh
 List of governors of Maharashtra
 List of governors of Manipur
 List of governors of Meghalaya
 List of governors of Mizoram
 List of governors of Nagaland
 List of governors of Odisha
 List of governors of Punjab (India)
 List of governors of Rajasthan
 List of governors of Sikkim
 List of governors of Tamil Nadu
 List of governors of Telangana
 List of governors of Tripura
 List of governors of Uttar Pradesh
 List of governors of Uttarakhand
 List of governors of West Bengal

Pre-independence
 List of governors of Bengal Presidency (1758–1947)
 List of governors of Bombay Presidency (1662–1948), also post-independence
 List of governors of Punjab (British India) (1921–1947)
 List of commissioners and governors of Sind in British India
 List of governors of the United Provinces of British India (1921–1937, United Kingdom)
 List of governors of the United Provinces (1937–1950, United Kingdom)
 List of colonial governors and presidents of Madras Presidency (1746–1749, French East India Company) (1746–1789, British East India Company) (1785–1947, United Kingdom)
 List of governors of Portuguese India (1504–1918)